The Harrison Street Bridge was a bridge which crossed the Embarras River east of Charleston, Illinois. Builders Oliver & Alexander constructed the bridge in 1898. The bridge was the only Camelback truss bridge ever built in Coles County.

The bridge was added to the National Register of Historic Places on November 30, 1981. At the time, the bridge was closed to vehicles and reported as being in poor condition. The bridge was demolished in 2011, and was delisted from the register in 2020.

References

Road bridges on the National Register of Historic Places in Illinois
Bridges completed in 1898
Bridges in Coles County, Illinois
National Register of Historic Places in Coles County, Illinois
Parker truss bridges in the United States
Former National Register of Historic Places in Illinois